The 30th Metro Manila Film Festival was held in Manila, Philippines, from December 25, 2004, to January 5, 2005.

Vilma Santos, Christopher de Leon and their movie, Mano Po III: My Love topped the 2004 Metro Manila Film Festival. Santos and de Leon won the Best Actress and Best Actor awards respectively for their roles in Mano Po III: My Love, which was also awarded the Festival's Best Picture. The Best Supporting Actor and Actress awards went to Dennis Trillo for Aishite Imasu 1941: Mahal Kita and Rebecca Lusterio for Panaghoy sa Suba.

Cesar Montano's Panaghoy sa Suba also received six other awards including the prestigious Gatpuno Antonio J. Villegas Cultural Awards, Best Director for Montano, and the Second Best Picture among others.

Entries

Winners and nominees

Awards
Winners are listed first and highlighted in boldface.

Multiple awards

Box Office gross

References

External links

Metro Manila Film Festival
MMFF
MMFF
MMFF
MMFF